The State Anthem of the Uzbek SSR was the national anthem of Uzbekistan when it was a republic of the Soviet Union and known as the Uzbek SSR.

Background
The anthem was used 1947 to 1992. The music was composed by Mutal Burkhanov, and the words were written by Timur Fattah and Turab Tula. The anthem (like those of the Tajik SSR and Turkmen SSR) opens with a salute to the Russian people, while the Uzbeks themselves are not actually mentioned until the fourth line.

The melody is used in the current national anthem of Uzbekistan, with different lyrics. It is one of the four remaining post-Soviet countries, along with Russia, Belarus, and Tajikistan, to continuously use their Soviet-era anthems with different lyrics. The Soviet-era lyrics were in use in the Republic of Uzbekistan from 1991 until 1992, when Abdulla Oripov wrote new lyrics.

Lyrics

1947–1956 Version

1978–1992 Version

Notes

References

External links
 MIDI file
 Instrumental recording in MP3 format (Short version)
 Lyrics - nationalanthems.info

Uzbek SSR
National symbols of Uzbekistan
Uzbekistani music
Uzbek Soviet Socialist Republic
National anthem compositions in G major